Anne Drungis (October 11, 1930 – July 15, 2005) was an American fencer. She competed in the women's team foil event at the 1964 Summer Olympics.

References

External links
 

1930 births
2005 deaths
American female foil fencers
Olympic fencers of the United States
Fencers at the 1964 Summer Olympics
Sportspeople from New York (state)
Sportspeople from Brooklyn
Pan American Games medalists in fencing
Pan American Games gold medalists for the United States
Fencers at the 1963 Pan American Games
20th-century American women
21st-century American women